Max Günthör (born 9 August 1985) is a German volleyball player. Max played at the Olympics, European Championship and World League. He won the bronze medal at the World Championship and the Champions league in 2007.
Günthör won Best Blocker award in Olympic Games 2012.

Sporting achievements

National team

World Championship
  2014 Poland

European League
  2009 Portugal

References

External links
Profile

1985 births
Living people
German men's volleyball players
People from Friedrichshafen
Sportspeople from Tübingen (region)
Olympic volleyball players of Germany
Volleyball players at the 2012 Summer Olympics
21st-century German people